KLUR is a radio station serving Wichita Falls, Texas and Vicinity with a country music format. It operates on FM frequency 99.9 MHz and is under ownership of Cumulus Media.

History
Construction of KLUR, named KFMC for its first few months of existence, began in November 1962, and the station signed on shortly after. The station was built and originally owned by Fred Marks, CEO of Nortex Broadcasting Company. KLUR Broadcasting Company bought the station in 1970 and upgraded it from 20,000 watts ERP to 100,000 three years later; Cumulus bought the station from the Beard family in 1997.

The station has had many nicknames including "King of the Country". Former on-air talent includes Bob St. Clair (Will Hutson), Dan Baker, and Jim Russell.

External links
99.9 KLUR - official website

Country radio stations in the United States
LUR
Cumulus Media radio stations